"Move" is a debut and only single by South Korean girl group 4L. It was released as a digital single on August 4, 2014, through Jade Contents Media and A&G Modes.

Release 
Jade Contents Media revealed the first teaser of "Move" on 28 July, bringing in a lot of attention due to the lesbian couple themed MV. After releasing two more provocative teasers, controversies arouse and the company responded with "Our strategy is to show raw sexiness. The teasers are just the tip of the iceberg."

4L released the full MV for "Move" on 1 August, while the single was released on Korean online websites three days later.

Promotions
4L held their debut stage on music shows with "Move" 14 September on SBS's Inkigayo. The reason for the big gap between the release of the song and the debut stage was that the choreography, song and clothes had to be changed.

Music video 
The full music video was released 1 August and reached 1 million views four days later. It was also the fifth most viewed worldwide Korean MV on YouTube in August, surpassing established songs from artists like Kara, Secret and Sistar. The video is lesbian themed, even though the lyrics are not.

Track listing
※ Bolded track title means it is the title track in the album.

Charts

References

2014 songs
2014 singles
Korean-language songs
2014 debut singles